Paolo Lorenzi was the defending champion, but lost in the second round to João Sousa.

Philipp Kohlschreiber won the title, defeating Sousa in the final, 6–3, 6–4.

This tournament was the last for the former world No.2 Tommy Haas who lost in the first round to Jan-Lennard Struff.

Seeds
The top four seeds receive a bye into the second round.

Draw

Finals

Top half

Bottom half

Qualifying

Seeds

Qualifiers

Lucky loser

  Thiago Monteiro

First qualifier

Second qualifier

Third qualifier

Fourth qualifier

References
 Main Draw
 Qualifying Draw

2017 ATP World Tour
2017 Singles